James Edward Baker (3 August 1911 – 22 February 1974) was an English footballer.

Career
Baker played for non-league Darlaston, before signing for Second Division side Wolverhampton Wanderers in 1930. However, he never made an appearance for their first team and departed for fellow second flight team Charlton Athletic after just one season at Molineux.

He joined Port Vale from the Londoners in June 1934. Despite being utilized as a left-back on occasion he managed to rack up a respectable tally of 8 goals in 21 games for the Hanley based club. However, he never won a regular first team spot and was released in April 1936, at which point he moved on to Barrow.

Career statistics
Source:

References

Footballers from Wolverhampton
English footballers
Association football defenders
Darlaston Town F.C. players
Wolverhampton Wanderers F.C. players
Charlton Athletic F.C. players
Port Vale F.C. players
Barrow A.F.C. players
English Football League players
1911 births
1974 deaths